Chomatobatrachus is a genus of prehistoric temnospondyl from the Triassic.

Taxonomy
A temnospondyl species placed in a monotypic genus Chomatobatrachus and allied to the Lydekkerinidae family.
The description was published in 1974 by the palaeontologist John W. Cosgriff.
The type locality is Meadowbank, a site associated with the Knocklofty Formation, where a skull was discovered in Induan terrestrial mudstone.

See also
 Prehistoric amphibian
 List of prehistoric amphibians

References

Stereospondyls
Fossil taxa described in 1974
Prehistoric amphibians of Australia
Paleontology in Tasmania